Celtis loxensis is a species of tree in the family Cannabaceae. It is native to Peru, Bolivia and Ecuador.

Description 
The trees are 3-7m tall, with smooth greyish white bark.

Ecology 
It occurs in semi-deciduous thorn scrub dominated by Cactaceae and Euphorbiaceae species. The type specimen was collected at about 1500 m.a.s.l. near Catamayo, Ecuador.

References 

Trees of Ecuador
Trees of Peru
loxensis